Viseu Dão-Lafões is a Portuguese subregion located in the north of the Central Region. In 2021, the subregion recorded 252,984 inhabitants and a population density of 78 inhabitants per km2. The subregion has an area of 3,238 km2, which can be divided into 14 municipalities and 156 parishes. The capital of the subregion is the city of Viseu, which is the largest city in the subregion and the third largest city in the Central Region, with 99,561 inhabitants in the entire municipality and 59,469 inhabitants in the urban area. It borders the Porto metropolitan area to the northwest, the Tâmega e Sousa subregion to the north, the Douro subregion to the northeast, the Beiras e Serra da Estrela subregion to the east, the Região de Coimbra subregion to the south and the Região de Aveiro subregion to the west.

Municipalities 
The subregion consists of the following 14 municipalities:

 Aguiar da Beira
 Carregal do Sal
 Castro Daire
 Mangualde
 Nelas
 Oliveira de Frades
 Penalva do Castelo
 Santa Comba Dão
 São Pedro do Sul
 Sátão
 Tondela
 Vila Nova de Paiva
 Viseu
 Vouzela

Demographics

Inhabitants 
The 2021 census shows that in the subregion the population has decreased to 252,796, compared to the year 2011, where the population was 267,728 and in 2001, where the population was 275,934. Castro Daire and Viseu are the only ones of the 14 municipalities that registered an increase, while the other 12 municipalities registered a decrease.

References

Former NUTS 3 statistical regions of Portugal